Chytriomyces elegans is a species of fungus in the genus Chytriomyces. It is saprophytic on dead cells of Ceratium hirundinella and Peridinium.

References

External links 

Chytridiomycota
Fungi described in 1976